Virginia's 23rd congressional district is an obsolete congressional district.  It was eliminated in 1823 after the 1820 U.S. Census.  Its last Congressman was Andrew Stevenson.

List of members representing the district

References 

 Congressional Biographical Directory of the United States 1774–present

23
Former congressional districts of the United States
Constituencies established in 1813
Constituencies disestablished in 1823
1813 establishments in Virginia
1823 disestablishments in Virginia